The men's road time trial competition at the 2018 Asian Games took place on 24 August 2018 in Subang.

Schedule
All times are Western Indonesia Time (UTC+07:00)

Results
Legend
DNS — Did not start

References

External links
Results

Men's road time trial